The 11th Australian Academy of Cinema and Television Arts International Awards, commonly known as the AACTA International Awards, is presented by the Australian Academy of Cinema and Television Arts (AACTA), a non-profit organisation whose aim is to identify, award, promote and celebrate Australia's greatest achievements in film and television. Awards were handed out for the best films of 2021 regardless of the country of origin, and are the international counterpart to the awards for Australian films.

Nominations were announced on 17 December 2021. Winners were announced on 26 January 2022.

Winners and nominees

Film

Television

References

External links
 The Official Australian Academy of Cinema and Television Arts website

AACTA International Awards
AACTA International Awards
AACTA Awards ceremonies
2021 in American cinema
AACTA Awards